The Valley of Bravery is a 1926 American silent Western film directed by Jack Nelson and starring Bob Custer, Eugenia Gilbert and Artie Ortego.

Synopsis
Two veterans of World War I return home and help a young woman fend off a man who is trying to steal her ranch.

Cast
 Bob Custer as Steve Tucker
 Tom Bay as Jim Saunders
 Eugenia Gilbert as Helen Coburn
 William Gillespie as Percy Winthrop
 Ernie Adams as Valet
 Artie Ortego as Joe 
 Nelson McDowell as Missouri
 Bobby Nelson as Young Boy

References

Bibliography
 Munden, Kenneth White. The American Film Institute Catalog of Motion Pictures Produced in the United States, Part 1. University of California Press, 1997.

External links
 

1926 films
1926 Western (genre) films
American black-and-white films
Films directed by Jack Nelson
Film Booking Offices of America films
Silent American Western (genre) films
1920s English-language films
1920s American films